Giuseppe Lupi (born 17 November 1894, date of death unknown) was an Italian gymnast. He competed in seven events at the 1928 Summer Olympics.

References

1894 births
Year of death missing
Italian male artistic gymnasts
Olympic gymnasts of Italy
Gymnasts at the 1928 Summer Olympics
Sportspeople from Genoa